Flavius Areobindus (died 449) was a general of the Eastern Roman Empire of Gothic origin, who became commander in chief of the East.

Biography
Areobindus was a Goth who became part of the political class of the Eastern Roman Empire; his son Dagalaifus was consul in 461, his grandson Areobindus Dagalaifus Areobindus held the consulate in 506.

He took part in the war of 422 against the Sasanids of king Bahram V, with the rank of comes foederatorum, or commander of the contingent of barbarians fighting as allies in the Roman army. On that occasion Areobindus defeated one of the Sasanids, Ardazanes, in a duel (mard o mard), and, following his victory, the peace was concluded.

In 434 Areobindus was chosen by the Eastern court as consul along with Aspar. In the same year he was appointed magister militum per Orientem (perhaps praesentialis), a position he held until his death. In 441 he was chosen by Theodosius II as one of the commanders of the expedition against the Vandals in Africa; the expedition was not successful because its leaders wasted time in Sicily. In 443 he was sent along with other generals against Attila, but he was defeated by the king of the Huns. In 447 he received the title of patricius, but by the year of his death Areobindus had fallen into disfavor with Theodosius II.

Areobindus was the recipient of two letters of Theodoret of Cyrrhus, which show that he had lands in that city, among others attested in Euphratensis.

Notes

Bibliography
 Jones, Arnold Hugh Martin, John Robert Martindale, John Morris, Prosopography of the Later Roman Empire, "Fl. Ariobindus 2", volume 2, Cambridge University Press, 1992, pp. 145–146.

449 deaths
5th-century Byzantine people
5th-century Romans of Gothic descent
5th-century Roman consuls
Comites
Correspondents of Theodoret
Gothic warriors
Imperial Roman consuls
Magistri militum
Patricii
People of the Roman–Sasanian Wars
Year of birth unknown